David Krumholtz (born May 15, 1978) is an American actor and comedian. He played Mr. Universe in Serenity, Charlie Eppes in the CBS drama series Numb3rs, and starred in the Harold & Kumar and The Santa Clause film franchises.

Early life
Krumholtz was born in Queens, New York City. He is the son of Michael, a postal worker, and Judy Krumholtz, a dental assistant. He grew up in a “very working-class, almost poor” Jewish family.  His paternal grandparents had emigrated from Poland, and his mother moved from Hungary to the U.S. in 1956.

Career
At the age of 14, Krumholtz followed his friends to an open audition for the Broadway play Conversations with My Father (1992). When he tried out, he won the role of Young Charlie, with Judd Hirsch, Tony Shalhoub and Jason Biggs, who was also making his Broadway debut. Soon after his run on Broadway, Krumholtz co-starred in two feature films, Life With Mikey (1993) with Michael J. Fox and Addams Family Values (1993) with Christina Ricci. For his role in Mikey, David was nominated for a 1993 Young Artist Award. Although his work in these two films garnered him critical attention, David is probably best known by children as the sarcastic head elf Bernard from The Santa Clause (1994) and its first sequel The Santa Clause 2 (2002). While he was not able to appear in The Santa Clause 3: The Escape Clause (2006) due to a scheduling conflict, he reprised the role two decades later in the Disney+ series The Santa Clauses (2022).

In 1994, Krumholtz co-starred in his first television series, Monty, with Henry Winkler; the show lasted only a few episodes. Krumholtz later starred in several short-lived series over the years. Along the way, he had the opportunity to work with Jason Bateman (Chicago Sons, 1997), Tom Selleck (The Closer, 1998), Jon Cryer (The Trouble with Normal, 2000), and Rob Lowe (The Lyon's Den, 2003). In 2005, he finally found television success with the CBS series Numb3rs. Along with his starring roles on television, Krumholtz made guest appearances on ER as schizophrenic patient Paul Sobriki, as well as on Law & Order, Law & Order: SVU, Lucky, Freaks and Geeks, and Undeclared.

He broke out of the children's movie genre with The Ice Storm (1997), directed by Ang Lee, and Slums of Beverly Hills (1998), starring Alan Arkin and Natasha Lyonne. In 1999, Krumholtz starred as Michael Eckman in the popular teen movie 10 Things I Hate About You with Larisa Oleynik, Joseph Gordon-Levitt, Julia Stiles, and Heath Ledger. That same year, he portrayed a completely different teen character – that of Yussel, a young conflicted Jewish man in Liberty Heights (1999).

It was the role of Yussel that brought Krumholtz to the attention of actor and filmmaker Edward Burns, who cast him in the independent film Sidewalks of New York (2001). Playing the romantic and slightly obsessed Benny, Krumholtz was on a path to larger, more complex film roles. His first role as a leading man was in the romantic comedy You Stupid Man (2002), opposite Milla Jovovich. Although never released theatrically in the United States, You Stupid Man, directed by Edward Burns's brother Brian Burns, was released on DVD (2006). Krumholtz carried his first leading role in a released American film when he starred in Big Shot: Confessions of a Campus Bookie (2002), which premiered on FX Networks.

Big Shot was a true story based on the Arizona State University basketball fixing scandal in 1994. Krumholtz played Benny Silman, a college student and campus bookmaker, who was jailed for his part in shaving points off key Arizona State basketball games. Benny was unlike any character Krumholtz had played before; and he garnered critical praise for his performance, proving that he was not just a sidekick.

In 2005, Krumholtz played Max in My Suicidal Sweetheart (formerly Max and Grace), once again starring opposite actress Natasha Lyonne. Krumholtz also returned to smaller key roles in the successful films Ray (2004) and Harold & Kumar Go to White Castle (2004). In September 2005, he was seen in Joss Whedon's science fiction film Serenity as "Mr. Universe", a hacker and information broker. Most recently, in early 2006, Krumholtz's 2003 film Kill the Poor screened in New York City at IFC Center and across the country on Comcast's On Demand cable service.

From 2005 to 2010, Krumholtz starred on the CBS television show Numb3rs. Krumholtz portrayed Charlie Eppes, a genius who used mathematics to help his FBI agent brother Don (Rob Morrow) solve crimes. The cast of Numbers also included Judd Hirsch and Peter MacNicol, who appeared with Krumholtz in Addams Family Values as a camp counselor. Critic Matt Roush (TV Guide) called Krumholtz's work on Numbers "probably his best TV work to date". Numbers was cancelled by CBS on May 18, 2010. He starred in the 2010 TV film Tax Man on Fox but was not picked up to series. He starred in The Playboy Club on NBC in 2011, but the show was cancelled after three episodes.

In 2012, Krumholtz was cast opposite Michael Urie in CBS' comedy TV series Partners but the show was cancelled after six episodes. In 2015, he played the titular role wearing heavy prosthetics as an elderly Jewish woman in the IFC comedy series Gigi Does It which he wrote and Co-created with Ricky Mabe and Zach Golden.

In more recent years, he has had minor roles in the Coen brothers films Hail Caesar! (2016) and The Ballad of Buster Scruggs (2018), while also appearing in films such as This Is the End (2013), The Judge (2014), Sausage Party (2016), and Wonder Wheel (2017).

He had a prominent recurring role as adult filmmaker Harvey Wasserman in the first two seasons of the HBO drama series The Deuce, before being promoted to a series regular for the third season. In 2020, he appeared as a series regular playing Monty Levin in the HBO miniseries The Plot Against America. 

In fall 2022, Krumholtz returned to the stage to play the role of Hermann Merz in the original Broadway cast of Tom Stoppard’s Leopoldstadt at The Longacre Theater in New York City.

Personal life
On May 22, 2010, Krumholtz married actress Vanessa Britting (born Vanessa Almeda Goonan), at The Plaza Hotel in New York City; they had been engaged since July 2008. They have a daughter, Pemma Mae Krumholtz, who was born in 2014 and a son Jonas born in 2016.

In July 2011, Krumholtz was diagnosed with thyroid cancer. He began a radioactive iodine treatment five months later. At the end of January 2012, he was pronounced cancer-free.

Filmography

Film

Television

Theatre

References

External links

 
 
 
 Interview about Krumholtz's guest appearance on ER

1978 births
20th-century American male actors
21st-century American male actors
American male child actors
American male film actors
American male stage actors
American male television actors
American people of Hungarian-Jewish descent
American people of Polish-Jewish descent
Jewish American male actors
Living people
Male actors from New York City
People from Queens, New York
21st-century American Jews
Disney people